Westerton is a village in County Durham, England. In the 2001 census Westerton had a population of 44. It is situated between Bishop Auckland and Spennymoor.  It sits on top of a hill which is one of the highest points in County Durham, and is the location of an observatory built for Thomas Wright, who was the first person to suggest that the Milky Way consisted of a flattened disk of stars.  The observatory is known today as "Wright's Folly".

References

External links

Villages in County Durham